Rivière du Milieu (English: River of the middle) may refer to:

 Rivière du Milieu (Normandin River tributary), a tributary of Poutrincourt Lake in Lac-Ashuapmushuan, Quebec, Canada
 Rivière du Milieu (Launière River tributary), Lac-Jacques-Cartier, Quebec, Canada
 Rivière du Milieu (Mékinac), Lac-Masketsi, Quebec, Canada
 Rivière du Milieu (lac de la Belle Rivière), Belle-Rivière, Quebec, Canada
 Rivière du Milieu (Lanaudière), Baie-de-la-Bouteille, MRC Matawinie, Lanaudière, Quebec, Canada

See also
 Rivière aux Écorces du Milieu, Lac-Jacques-Cartier, Quebec, Canada
 Rivière Noire du Milieu, Mont-Élie, Quebec, Canada
 Rivière Pierriche du Milieu, La Tuque, Mauricie, Quebec, Canada
 Rivière Port-Daniel du Milieu, Port-Daniel–Gascons, MRC Le Rocher-Percé, Gaspésie–Îles-de-la-Madeleine, Quebec, Canada
 Rivière Wessonneau du Milieu, La Tuque, Mauricie, Quebec, Canada